Homoephloeus licheneus is a species of beetle in the family Cerambycidae, and the only species in the genus Homoephloeus. It was described by Gahan in 1892.

References

Anisocerini
Beetles described in 1892
Monotypic beetle genera